Dynamic link matching is a graph-based system for image recognition.  It uses wavelet transformations to encode incoming image data.

References

External links
Original paper on Dynamic Link Matching

Wavelets
Pattern recognition
Graph algorithms